The Canton of Orly is an administrative division of the Val-de-Marne department, Île-de-France region, northern France. Its borders were modified at the French canton reorganisation which came into effect in March 2015. Its seat is in Orly.

It consists of the following communes:
Ablon-sur-Seine
Orly
Villeneuve-le-Roi

References

Cantons of Val-de-Marne